The 2018 Army Black Knights football team represented the United States Military Academy as an independent in the 2018 NCAA Division I FBS football season. The Black Knights were led by fifth-year head coach Jeff Monken and played their home games at Michie Stadium. Following their 28–14 victory over Colgate in Week 12, Army entered the AP Poll at No. 23 and the Coaches' Poll at No. 24, the first time Army had entered the national rankings since finishing the 1996 season at No. 25 in the AP and No. 24 in the Coaches'. On December 2, Army accepted an invite to participate in the Armed Forces Bowl against the Houston Cougars of the American Athletic Conference. On December 8, Army defeated its archrival Navy by a score of 17–10, increasing their Army-Navy Game win streak to three in a row and winning the Commander-in-Chief's Trophy for the second straight year. With the win the Black Knights also secured their second straight 10-win season, the first time that had been accomplished in the Academy's long and storied history. In the Armed Forces Bowl, they defeated Houston by a score of 70–14 to tie NCAA bowl game records for points scored and margin of victory. Their 11 wins are the most in one season in program history. As a result of his team's 2018 accomplishments, Coach Monken was awarded the George Munger Collegiate Coach of the Year Award by the Maxwell Football Club, the Vince Lombardi College Football Coach of the Year Award by the Lombardi Foundation, and the President's Award by the Touchdown Club of Columbus. Army finished the season with a ranking of No. 19 in the AP Poll and No. 20 in the Coaches' Poll, their highest finish in both polls since Pete Dawkins's Heisman Trophy-winning season in 1958 where the Cadets finished No. 3 in both polls. Following the completion of the season, the Black Knights were awarded the 2018 Lambert Trophy by the Eastern College Athletic Conference (ECAC) and Metropolitan New York Football Writers, signifying them as the best team in the East in Division I FBS. This was the eighth overall time the Lambert Trophy had been awarded to Army, and the first since 1958.

Previous season
The Black Knights opened the 2017 season with two consecutive wins over teams they had lost to over the previous two years: a blowout win over Fordham and a fourth-quarter comeback over Buffalo to open the year at 2–0. They then dropped the next two games against No. 8 (final No. 5) Ohio State and Tulane. Following these setbacks, the Black Knights ripped off a string of six straight wins, highlighted by a 31–28 overtime victory against Temple to become bowl eligible, a 21–0 beat-down of service-academy rival Air Force (the first shutout of a service-academy opponent by Army since a 27–0 victory over Navy on Nov. 29, 1969), and a 21–16 victory over Duke to secure their first unbeaten home schedule in a season since the 1996 team that finished 10–2 (and just the sixth Black Knights squad to go undefeated at home since 1960). Following this string of victories, Army dropped a shootout to 2016 Heart of Dallas Bowl opponent North Texas on a last second field goal to enter the 118th Army-Navy game with a record of 8–3 and the opportunity to secure their first Commander-in-Chief's Trophy in over twenty years.

In a steady snowfall on the afternoon of December 8, after hosting ESPN's College GameDay and wearing uniforms honoring the U.S. Army's 10th Mountain Division, the Black Knights defeated their arch-rival Navy by a score of 14–13 after taking the lead on a fourth-quarter go-ahead scoring drive followed by a missed last-second 48-yard Midshipmen field goal. This secured their second victory in a row over Navy and their first Commander-in-Chief's Trophy since 1996.

The Army team then capped off the season by earning their second straight bowl victory (first time since the 1984–1985 seasons) over the San Diego State Aztecs in the Armed Forces Bowl by converting a go-ahead 2-pt conversion after scoring with 18 seconds left in regulation (with the final score being 42–35 following a fumble returned for a touchdown as SDSU attempted a lateral-filled desperation tying score on the last play of the game).    This secured the Black Knights' second ever 10-win season, finishing with a final record of 10–3.  Following the season, they were chosen as the 2017 ECAC Division I Football Subdivision Team of the Year. Quarterback Ahmad Bradshaw finished the season with an Army and all-service-academy single-season rushing record of 1,746 yards.

Preseason

Award watch lists
Listed in the order that they were released

Personnel

Roster

Schedule

Rankings

Game summaries

at Duke

Liberty

Hawaii

at Oklahoma

at Buffalo

vs. San Jose State

Miami (OH)

at Eastern Michigan

Air Force

Lafayette

Colgate

vs. Navy

vs. Houston – Armed Forces Bowl

References

Army
Army Black Knights football seasons
Armed Forces Bowl champion seasons
Lambert-Meadowlands Trophy seasons
Army Black Knights football